New Whittington is a village located in the Borough of Chesterfield, in Derbyshire, England, near to Whittington Moor and Old Whittington. It is also to the west of Barrow Hill and Staveley. In 2011 the Barrow Hill and New Whittington ward had a population of 5,903. 

There are 3 shops located in new Whittington these are Londis, select and save and a corner shop 
 

Revolution House, now a museum, is located between New and Old Whittington.

St Barnabas Church 
The village is served by St. Barnabas Church.

Notable people 
Joseph Lynch (1883-1972) - Trade unionist

References 

Villages in Derbyshire
Chesterfield, Derbyshire